José María Cuenco  (19 May 1885 – 8 October 1972) was Filipino prelate of the Catholic Church and was the first Archbishop of the Archdiocese of Jaro in the Philippines.

Early life 

Archbishop Cuenco was born on 19 May 1885 in Carmen, Cebu, Philippines. He was the eldest child of Mariano Albao Cuenco and Remedios Diosomito. His father, a journalist and Clerk of Court, died in 1909. His mother largely raised Jose's 15 sisters and brothers, among them, Mariano Jesús and Miguel, who became a senator and congressman respectively. The Cuenco family were involved with printing and publishing as newspaper publishers and owners of Imprenta Rosario, one of Cebu's early print shops.

Education 
Cuenco graduated from University of San Carlos in Cebu and Manila. He also graduated from Georgetown University in the United States, where he earned a doctorate in law. Cuenco decided to forsake a career in law to enter the priesthood. He was ordained a priest on 11 June 1914.

Career 
It was as a churchman that Cuenco had a distinguished career. He was vicar general of the Cebu Diocese in 1925 and the founding parish priest of the city's Santo Rosario parish in 1933. He became titular bishop of Hemeria and auxiliary bishop of Jaro in 1941. Four years after, he succeeded James Paul McCloskey as Ordinary concurrent with the elevation of the see as a metropolitan, which effectively made him its first Archbishop. In 1957 Cuenco received an honorary degree from Santa Clara University.

Works 
Cuenco was the founder-editor of the Cebu Catholic newspaper El Boletin Catolico (1915-1930), continuing the work of his own father who was publisher-editor of the pioneering Catholic newspaper in Cebu, Ang Camatuoran (1902-1911).

He authored and published close to a dozen books, mostly narratives of his travels and experiences, including Archbishop Cuenco: Autobiography (Iloilo: La Editorial, 1972), which came out shortly before he died in Jaro on 8 October 1972.

Notes

References

External links 
 
 Historical Photograph of Jose Ma. Cuenco | Southeast Asia Digital Library
 

1885 births
1972 deaths
Georgetown University Law Center alumni
University of San Carlos alumni
Jose Maria
People from Cebu
Roman Catholic archbishops of Jaro